Fulton Township is a township in Webster County, Iowa.

References

Townships in Webster County, Iowa
Townships in Iowa